Karl Oloph Granath (born October 17, 1951 in Kolsva) is a former ice speed skater from Sweden, who represented his native country at the 1980 Winter Olympics in Lake Placid, United States. He also competed at the 1976 Winter Olympics.

References

1951 births
Living people
Swedish male speed skaters
Speed skaters at the 1976 Winter Olympics
Speed skaters at the 1980 Winter Olympics
Olympic speed skaters of Sweden